= Lakereia (Thessaly) =

Coordinates: 39°40′29″N 22°39′46″E

Lakereia (Ancient Greek: Λακέρεια) was a town in ancient Thessaly.

Its site is tentatively located near the modern Marmariani Magoula.
